Judson Burpee Black (August 15, 1842 – December 9, 1924) was a Canadian physician and politician.

Born in St. Martins, New Brunswick, the son of Thomas Henry Black and Mary E. Fownes, Black was educated at the public schools of St. Martins and Saint John, New Brunswick, Mount Allison Academy, Mount Allison University and Dartmouth Medical College. A physician, he was mayor of Windsor, Nova Scotia, from 1884 to 1885 and from 1901 to 1903. He was president of the Windsor Board of Trade in 1900 and 1901. He was president for Nova Scotia of the Canadian Medical Association in 1904–05.

He was first elected to the House of Commons of Canada for the Nova Scotia electoral district of Hants at the general elections of 1904. A Liberal, he was re-elected in 1908 and 1911.

Electoral record

References
 The Canadian Parliament; biographical sketches and photo-engravures of the senators and members of the House of Commons of Canada. Being the tenth Parliament, elected November 3, 1904

External links
 

1842 births
1924 deaths
Liberal Party of Canada MPs
Mayors of places in Nova Scotia
Members of the House of Commons of Canada from Nova Scotia
People from Saint John County, New Brunswick